In mathematics, a sober space is a topological space X such that  every (nonempty) irreducible closed subset of X is the closure of exactly one point of X: that is, every irreducible closed subset has a unique generic point.

Definitions
Sober spaces have a variety of cryptomorphic definitions, which are documented in this section. All except the definition in terms of nets are described in. In each case below, replacing "unique" with "at most one" gives an equivalent formulation of the T0 axiom. Replacing it with "at least one" is equivalent to the property that the T0 quotient of the space is sober, which is sometimes referred to as having "enough points" in the literature.

In terms of morphisms of frames and locales 

This may be viewed as a correspondence between the notion of a point in a locale and a point in a topological space, which is the motivating definition.

Using completely prime filters 
A filter F of open sets is said to be completely prime if for any family  of open sets such that , we have that  for some i. A space X is sober if it each completely prime filter is the neighbourhood filter of a unique point in X.

In terms of nets 
A space is sober if every self-convergent net  converges strongly to a unique point .

In particular, a space is T1 and sober precisely if every self-convergent net is constant.

With irreducible closed sets 
A closed set is irreducible if it cannot be written as the union of two proper closed subsets. A space is sober if every irreducible closed subset is the closure of a unique point.

As a property of sheaves on the space 
A space X is sober if every functor from the category of sheaves Sh(X) to Set that preserves all finite limits and all small colimits must be the  stalk functor of a unique point x.

Properties and examples
Any Hausdorff (T2) space is sober (the only irreducible subsets being points), and all sober spaces are Kolmogorov (T0), and both implications are strict.

Sobriety is not comparable to the T1 condition:
 an example of a T1 space which is not sober is an infinite set with the cofinite topology, the whole space being an irreducible closed subset with no generic point;
 an example of a sober space which is not T1 is the Sierpinski space.

Moreover T2 is stronger than T1 and sober, i.e., while every  T2 space is at once T1 and sober, there exist spaces that are simultaneously T1 and sober, but not T2. One such example is the following: let X be the set of real numbers, with a new point p adjoined; the open sets being all real open sets, and all cofinite sets containing p.

Sobriety of X is precisely a condition that forces the lattice of open subsets of X to determine X up to homeomorphism, which is relevant to pointless topology.

Sobriety makes the specialization preorder a directed complete partial order.

Every continuous directed complete poset equipped with the Scott topology is sober.

Finite T0 spaces are sober.

The prime spectrum Spec(R) of a commutative ring R with the Zariski topology is a compact sober space.   In fact, every spectral space (i.e. a compact sober space for which the collection of compact open subsets is closed under finite intersections and forms a base for the topology) is homeomorphic to Spec(R) for some commutative ring R. This is a theorem of Melvin Hochster.
More generally, the underlying topological space of any scheme is a sober space.

The subset of Spec(R) consisting only of the maximal ideals, where R is a commutative ring, is not sober in general.

See also
 Stone duality, on the duality between topological spaces that are sober and frames (i.e. complete Heyting algebras) that are spatial.

References

Further reading
 
 

General topology
Separation axioms

Properties of topological spaces